The following is a list of places of interest in Bermuda.

City of Hamilton
Hamilton Harbour

Hamilton Parish
Harrington Sound – large inlet surrounded for all but a small distance by the Bermudian mainland.
Crystal Cave – natural limestone caves open to the public
Mangrove Lake
Trott's Pond - small lake
Flatt's Village – one of Bermuda's five main settlements

Paget Parish
Salt Kettle Peninsula
Bermuda Botanical Gardens

Pembroke Parish
Spanish Point
Government House – home of the Governor of Bermuda

Sandys Parish
Royal Naval Dockyard 
Somerset Village – one of Bermuda's five main settlements.
Somerset Bridge – the world's smallest working drawbridge.
Bermuda Maritime Museum

Smith's Parish
Devil's Hole – sinkhole which forms a natural aquarium

Southampton Parish
Gibbs Hill Lighthouse – the tallest building in Bermuda, visible from most points in the islands.
Horseshoe Bay – Bermuda's most famous beach.
Little Sound – a natural sheltered harbour, the southern section of the Great Sound - the body of water which is surrounded by the Bermuda chain.
Church Bay – Bermuda's "best" snorkelling.

St. George's Parish
Ferry Reach
Annie's Bay
Castle Harbour
Castle Island
Paget Island
Smith's Island
St. David's Head
St. David's Island
Tucker's Town Peninsula
Tucker's Town – one of Bermuda's five main settlements
Nonsuch Island – wildlife sanctuary

St. George's Town
Featherbed Alley Printshop
Ordnance Island
St. George's Harbour

Geography of Bermuda
Tourist attractions in Bermuda